Arnold Rylott (18 February 1839 – 17 April 1914) was an English cricketer who played for Marylebone Cricket Club (MCC) from 1872 to 1888 and for pre-first-class Leicestershire between 1875 and 1890.

Rylott was born in Grantham, Lincolnshire. He began his professional cricket career in 1867 at the Birkenhead Club, and stayed there for three years until he was employed at Grantham from 1870 to 1871. He made his first-class cricket debut in 1870 for Left Handed. In 1872 he joined the ground staff at Lord's and eventually became head of the ground staff. He also played as a soccer midfielder for Grantham Town on 20 October 1874 against the Third Volunteer Lincolnshire RIfles. Most of his 85 first-class cricket matches were for the MCC, but he also played for England, England XI, Players, North, Players of the North, United North of England, Orleans Club, Single and Over 30. In 1875, he became qualified to play cricket for Leicestershire in their pre-first-class days. He also played a game for Staffordshire in 1877.

Rylott was a left-arm fast bowler and took 456 first-class wickets at an average of 11.69 and a best performance of nine for 30. He was a right-handed tail-end batsman and played 137 innings in 85 first-class matches with an average of 6.33 and a top score of 45.

Rylott umpired occasionally until he retired from playing and became a regular umpire until 1901. He was the author of a book of verse called Our Bobby Rylott when a Boy.

Rylott died of pneumonia at Sandy, Bedfordshire, at the age of 75.

References 

1839 births
1914 deaths
English cricketers
Marylebone Cricket Club cricketers
North v South cricketers
Players cricketers
Orleans Club cricketers
People from Grantham
Deaths from pneumonia in England
Players of the North cricketers